Maung Maung Kha (7 June 1920 – 30 April 1995) was Prime Minister of Burma between 1977 and 1988.

Maung Maung Kha was born to Khin Tint and Chit Pe in Yangon. He enrolled in University of Rangoon in 1937 to study engineering but left school in the final year of studies to join the Burma Independence Army (BIA) in 1941. He completed military training, and became a member of the Burmese armed forces during the Japanese occupation of Burma (1942–1945). After independence in 1948, he rose to the rank of colonel and served as the Director of Defence Industries of Burmese Armed Forces.

Colonel Maung Maung Kha became a cabinet member in Gen. Ne Win's military government in 1972 when he was appointed Minister of Industry. Following the establishment of the Socialist Republic of the Union of Burma on 4 January 1974, and adoption of a new Constitution, Maung Maung Kha continued to serve as Minister of Industry and later on as Minister of Mines. On 29 March 1977, he was appointed as the 8th Prime Minister of Myanmar. After increasing unrest in the country, on 26 July 1988, Maung Maung Kha was replaced by Tun Tin as Prime Minister.

References

1920 births
1995 deaths
Burma Socialist Programme Party politicians
People from Yangon
Industry ministers of Myanmar
Mining ministers of Myanmar